Ribbon weed may refer to:

 Posidonia australis, a species of seagrass found in the ocean off southern Australia
 Stuckenia pectinata (Potamogeton pectinatus), a freshwater plant

See also
 Ribbonleaf pondweed, Potamogeton epihydrus, a freshwater flowering plant